Pisania is a genus of marine whelk in the family Pisaniidae.  Some species prey on barnacles.

Species
According to the World Register of Marine Species (WoRMS) species with accepted names within the genus Pisania include:
 Pisania angusta Smith, 1899
 Pisania bilirata (Reeve, 1846) 
 Pisania costata Thiele, 1925
 Pisania decollata (Sowerby I, 1833)
 Pisania fasciculata (Reeve, 1846)
 Pisania gracilis (Sowerby, 1859)
 Pisania hedleyi (Iredale, 1912)
 Pisania hermannseni A. Adams, 1855
 Pisania ignea (Gmelin, 1790)
 Pisania jenningsi (Cernohorsky, 1966)
 Pisania lirocincta G.B. Sowerby III, 1910
 Pisania luctuosa Tapparone-Canefri, 1880
 † Pisania magna Foresti, 1868
 † Pisania mariavictoriae Brunetti & Della Bella, 2016 
 † Pisania plioangustata Sacco, 1904
 Pisania pusio (Linnaeus, 1758)
 Pisania rosadoi Bozzetti & Ferrario, 2005
 Pisania scholvieni Rolle, 1892
 Pisania solomonensis E.A.Smith, 1876
 Pisania striata (Gmelin, 1791)
 Pisania sugimotoi (Habe, 1968)
 † Pisania transsylvanica (Hoernes & Auinger, 1884) 
 Pisania tritonoides (Reeve, 1846)
 'Pisania unicolor (Angas, 1876)

Taxon inquirendum
 Pisania amphodon van Martens, 1880 
 Pisania strigata Pease, 1863

The Shell-bearing Mollusca database also adds the following names 
 Pisania australis W. H. Pease, 1871 Australia
 Pisania brevialaxe T. Kuroda & T. Habe, 1961 Australia
 Pisania clathrata Dautzenberg & Fischer, 1906 Morocco
 Pisania grimaldii Ph. Dautzenberg, 1889 Australia

 Synonymized species
 Pisania aequilirata Carpenter, 1857: synonym of Pusio elegans (Gray in Griffith & Pidgeon, 1833)
 Pisania auritula Link, 1807 East America : synonym of Gemophos auritulus (Link, 1807)
 † Pisania baetica Lozano-Francisco & Vera-Peláez, 2006 : synonym of † Pisania magna Foresti, 1868 
 Pisania bednalli G. B. Sowerby III, 1895: synonym of Pollia bednalli (G. B. Sowerby III, 1895) (original combination)
 Pisania bernardoi Costa & dos Santos Gomes, 1998: synonym of Dianthiphos bernardoi (Costa & Gomes, 1998)
 Pisania billeheusti Petit, 1946 Hawaiian Islands: synonym of Prodotia iostoma (Gray, 1834)
 Pisania cingulata (Reeve, 1846): synonym of Japeuthria cingulata (Reeve, 1846)
 Pisania cingulatum(sic): synonym of Japeuthria cingulata (Reeve, 1846)
 Pisania crenilabrum A. Adams, 1855: synonym of Pisania fasciculata (Reeve, 1846)
 Pisania crocata (Reeve, 1846): synonym of Prodotia crocata (Reeve, 1846)
 Pisania dorbignyi Payraudeau, 1826: synonym of Pollia dorbignyi (Payraudeau, 1826): synonym of Aplus dorbignyi (Payraudeau, 1826)
 Pisania englerti Hertlein, 1960: synonym of Caducifer englerti (Hertlein, 1960)
 Pisania ferrea (L. A. Reeve, 1847) Indo-Pacific: synonym of Japeuthria ferrea (Reeve, 1847)
 Pisania flavescens Hutton, 1884: synonym of Buccinulum vittatum vittatum (Quoy & Gaimard, 1833) represented as Buccinulum vittatum (Quoy & Gaimard, 1833)
 Pisania fortis Carpenter, 1866: synonym of †Pusio fortis (Carpenter, 1866)  (original combination)
 Pisania gaskelli Melvill, 1891 : synonym of Orania gaskelli (Melvill, 1891)
 Pisania gracilis (Reeve, 1846): synonym of Prodotia lannumi (Schwengel, 1950)
 Pisania janeirensis (Philippi, 1849): synonym of Pisania pusio (Linnaeus, 1758)
 Pisania karinae (Nowell-Usticke, 1959): synonym of Hesperisternia karinae (Nowell-Usticke, 1959)
 Pisania laevigata Bivona-Bernardi, 1832: synonym of Mitrella scripta (Linnaeus, 1758)
 Pisania maculosa (Lamarck, 1822): synonym of Pisania striata (Gmelin, 1791)
 † Pisania media Hutton, 1885 : synonym of † Buccinulum medium (Hutton, 1885)
 Pisania mollis A. A. Gould, 1860 Indo-Pacific: synonym of Pollia mollis (Gould, 1860) (original combination)
 Pisania montrouzieri Crosse, 1862: synonym of Pisania fasciculata (Reeve, 1846)
 Pisania naevosa Martens, 1880: synonym of Prodotia naevosa (Martens, 1880) (original combination); synonym of Sinetectula naevosa (E. von Martens, 1880) (original combination)
 Pisania nodulosa Bivona Ant., 1832: synonym of Pollia dorbignyi (Payraudeau, 1826)
 Pisania orbignyi [sic]: synonym of Aplus dorbignyi (Payraudeau, 1826) (incorrect subsequent spelling of dorbignyi (Payraudeau, 1826))
 † Pisania plioalboranensis Lozano-Francisco & Vera-Peláez, 2006 : synonym of † Pisania plioangustata Sacco, 1904 
 Pisania reticulata A. Adams, 1855: synonym of Cumia mestayerae (Iredale, 1915) (invalid: secondary homonym of Colubraria or Cumia reticulata (Blainville, 1829); Fusus mestayerae is a replacement name)
 Pisania rubiginosa Reeve, 1846: synonym of Pollia rubiginosa (Reeve, 1846)
 Pisania schoutanica May, 1910  synonym of Fusus schoutanicus (May, 1910)
 Pisania striatula Bivona-Bernardi, 1832: synonym of Pisania striata (Gmelin, 1791)
 Pisania tinctus (T. A. Conrad, 1846) East America: synonym of Gemophos tinctus (Conrad, 1846)÷
 Pisania townsendi Melvill, 1918: synonym of Prodotia townsendi (Melvill, 1918)
 Pisania truncatus Hinds, 1844: synonym of Caducifer truncatus (Hinds, 1844)

References

 Gofas, S.; Le Renard, J.; Bouchet, P. (2001). Mollusca, in: Costello, M.J. et al. (Ed.) (2001). European register of marine species: a check-list of the marine species in Europe and a bibliography of guides to their identification. Collection Patrimoines Naturels, 50: pp. 180–213

External links
  Bivona-Bernardi Ant. 1832. Caratteri d'un nuovo genere di conchiglie della famiglia delle Columellarie del Signor de Lamarck. Effemeride Scientifiche e Letterarie per la Sicilia 2(1): 8-13
 Iredale, T. (1912). New generic names and new species of marine Mollusca. Proceedings of the Malacological Society of London. 10(3): 217-228, pl. 9
  Cernohorsky, W. O. (1966). A new genus and species of Buccinidae from the Fiji Islands (Mollusca: Gastropoda). The Veliger. 9(2): 229-232
 Dall, W. H. (1904). An historical and systematic review of the frogshells and tritons. Smithsonian Miscellaneous Collections. 47: 114-144

Pisaniidae